The 1947 Cincinnati Reds season was a season in American baseball. The team finished fifth in the National League with a record of 73–81, 21 games behind the Brooklyn Dodgers.

Offseason 
 November 1, 1946: Virgil Stallcup was drafted by the Reds from the Boston Red Sox in the 1946 rule 5 draft.

Regular season 
 May 13: Jackie Robinson played in his first game in Cincinnati. The Reds won the game 7–5 over Robinson and the Dodgers. In the loss, Robinson had a walk, a single, and a run. Various racial slurs were hurled at Robinson by the fans. Dodgers shortstop Pee Wee Reese put his hand on Robinson's shoulder to hush the crowd.

Season standings

Record vs. opponents

Roster

Player stats

Batting

Starters by position 
Note: Pos = Position; G = Games played; AB = At bats; H = Hits; Avg. = Batting average; HR = Home runs; RBI = Runs batted in

Other batters 
Note: G = Games played; AB = At bats; H = Hits; Avg. = Batting average; HR = Home runs; RBI = Runs batted in

Pitching

Starting pitchers 
Note: G = Games pitched; IP = Innings pitched; W = Wins; L = Losses; ERA = Earned run average; SO = Strikeouts

Other pitchers 
Note: G = Games pitched; IP = Innings pitched; W = Wins; L = Losses; ERA = Earned run average; SO = Strikeouts

Relief pitchers 
Note: G = Games pitched; W = Wins; L = Losses; SV = Saves; ERA = Earned run average; SO = Strikeouts

Farm system 

LEAGUE CHAMPIONS: Syracuse

Notes

References 
1947 Cincinnati Reds season at Baseball Reference

Cincinnati Reds seasons
Cincinnati Reds
Cincinnati Reds